Somdet Phra Ramesuan (1339–1395), son of king Ramathibodi I, reigned as the second and fifth king of the kingdom of Ayutthaya.  When King Ramathibodi ascended to the throne of Ayuthaya, he sent King Ramesuan to reign in Lavo.  Upon  King Ramathibodi's death in 1369, King Ramesuan traveled to Ayutthaya to assume the throne, but held it for less than a year before being deposed by his uncle, King Borommaracha I, the ruler of Suphanburi.  Sources differ over the nature of their conflict; official chronicles state that the older Boromaracha ruled with the willing consent of his nephew, while Jeremias van Vliet's Short History of Thailand indicated that Boromaracha's ascension came only after a bloody conflict bordering on civil war.

Whatever the case, by 1388 King Ramesuan had gathered sufficient support from his power base in Lavo to return to Ayutthaya and challenge Boromarachi's 17-year-old son Thong Lan for the throne.  King Ramesuan's forces quickly took the palace and executed Thong Lan.  King Ramesuan then held the throne until 1395, when he was succeeded by his son Rama (also known as Ramaracha).

During King Ramesuan's second reign, the king seems to have come to an understanding with the kingdom of Sukhothai, against whom Boromaracha had warred throughout his reign.  Instead, some sources record conflicts with the kingdom of Lan Na (in northern Thailand), and the empire of Angkor.  Ayutthaya chronicles indicate that King Ramesuan took Chiang Mai, then the capital of the kingdom of Lan Na, in 1390 and settled many captives within the kingdom of Ayutthaya.

A similar defeat of Angkor is recorded as having taken place in 1393, in response to raids from the Cambodian kingdom.  He placed his son on the throne but he was soon assassinated.  Neither of these battles are attested to by chronicles from Lan Na or Angkor.

Ancestry

References

 Wyatt, David K., Thailand: A Short History, New Haven (Yale University), 2003.  

1339 births
1395 deaths
Uthong dynasty
Kings of Ayutthaya
14th-century monarchs in Asia
Princes of Ayutthaya
14th-century Thai people